Poomadhathe Pennu is a 1984 Indian Malayalam-language film, directed by Hariharan and produced by G. P. Vijayakumar. The film stars Prem Nazir, Unnimary, K. P. Ummer and M. G. Soman. The film's score was composed by G. Devarajan.

Plot
Poomadhathe Pennu is an emotional family film.

Cast

Prem Nazir as Vasudevan
Unnimary as Nalini
K. P. Ummer as Sreedharan
M. G. Soman as Somashekharan
Ramu as Rajagopal
Mucherla Aruna as Janu
Kuthiravattom Pappu as Jeeevikkan marannupoya Khalid
Paravoor Bharathan as Ayyappan Adiyodi
T. G. Ravi as Kochaniyan
Nellikode Bhaskaran as Hajiar
Sathaar as Raghavan
Sathyakala as Susheela
 Y. Vijaya as Police Ponnamma
C. I. Paul as Udumban Joseph
Pattom Sadan as Nanu Nair
Aranmula Ponnamma as Grandmother
Rajkumar Sethupathi as Anand
Anuradha as Dancer
Santo Krishnan as Gunda

Soundtrack
The music was composed by G. Devarajan with lyrics by Mankombu Gopalakrishnan.

References

External links
 

1984 films
1980s Malayalam-language films
Films directed by Hariharan